James Columbus "Jay" McShann (January 12, 1916 – December 7, 2006) was an American jazz pianist, vocalist, composer, and bandleader. He led bands in Kansas City, Missouri, that included Charlie Parker, Bernard Anderson, Walter Brown, and Ben Webster.

Early life and education
McShann was born in Muskogee, Oklahoma, and was nicknamed Hootie. During his youth he taught himself how to play the piano through observing his sister's piano lessons and trying to practicing tunes he heard off the radio. He was also heavily influenced by late-night broadcasts of pianist Earl Hines from Chicago's Grand Terrace Cafe: "When 'Fatha' (Hines) went off the air, I went to bed". He began working as a professional musician in 1931 at the age of 15, performing around Tulsa, Oklahoma, and neighboring Arkansas.

Career

1936–44
McShann moved to Kansas City, Missouri, in 1936, and set up his own big band which variously featured Charlie Parker (1937–42), Al Hibbler, Ben Webster, Paul Quinichette, Bernard Anderson, Gene Ramey, Jimmy Coe, Gus Johnson (1938–43), Harold "Doc" West, Earl Coleman, Walter Brown, and Jimmy Witherspoon, among others. His first recordings were all with Charlie Parker, the first as the Jay McShann Orchestra on August 9, 1940.

The band played both swing and blues numbers, but played blues on most of its records; its most popular recording was "Confessin' the Blues" with Walter Brown on vocals. The group disbanded when McShann was drafted into the Army in 1944. After his return two years later, he found that small groups were now taking the place of big-bands in the jazz scene.

McShann told the Associated Press in 2003: "You'd hear some cat play, and somebody would say, 'This cat, he sounds like he's from Kansas City.' It was Kansas City Style. They knew it on the East Coast. They knew it on the West Coast. They knew it up North, and they knew it down South."

1945–2006
After World War II McShann began to lead small groups featuring the blues shouter Jimmy Witherspoon. Witherspoon began to record with McShann in 1945 and, fronting McShann's band, he had a hit in 1949 with "Ain't Nobody's Business". As well as writing much material, Witherspoon continued recording with McShann's band, which also featured Ben Webster. McShann had a modern rhythm and blues hit with "Hands Off", featuring a vocal by Priscilla Bowman, in 1955.

In the late 1960s, McShann often performed as a singer as well as a pianist, often with violinist Claude Williams. He continued recording and touring through the 1990s. Well into his 80s, McShann still performed occasionally, particularly in the Kansas City area and Toronto, Ontario, where he made his last recording, "Hootie Blues", in February 2001, after a recording career of 61 years. In 1979, he appeared prominently in The Last of the Blue Devils, a documentary film about Kansas City jazz.

One of McShann's favorite stories to tell was how band member and friend Charlie Parker got his nickname "Bird". During their drive to a gig in Nebraska with a car full of musicians, the driver of the car accidentally hit a chicken. According to McShann, Parker requested the driver turn around so he could get the bird, and sat with it in the backseat of the car all the way to Lincoln. Once they arrived he asked the keeper of the home they were staying in to cook it up for him.

McShann died on December 7, 2006, in Kansas City, Missouri at the age of 90.

Awards and honors
 Member, Oklahoma Music Hall of Fame, 1998
 Member, Blues Hall of Fame
 Member, Oklahoma Jazz Hall of Fame, 1989
 Pioneer Award,  Rhythm and Blues Foundation
 Grammy nomination, Best Large Jazz Ensemble Performance, Paris All-Star Blues (A Tribute to Charlie Parker), 1991
 Grammy nomination, Best Traditional Blues Album, Goin' to Kansas City, 2003
American Jazz Masters Grant from National Endowment for the Arts, 1986

Discography

As leader
 Goin' to Kansas City Blues (RCA Victor, 1957)
 McShann's Piano (Capitol, 1967)
 Confessin' the Blues (Black and Blue, 1970)
 Going to Kansas City (Master Jazz, 1972)
 Jumpin' the Blues with Milt Buckner (Black and Blue, 1972)
 Kansas City Memories (Black and Blue, 1973)
 The Band That Jumps the Blues! (Black Lion, 1973)
 Early Bird with Charlie Parker (Spotlite, 1973)
 Vine Street Boogie (Black Lion, 1974)
 Kansas City Joys with Buddy Tate, Paul Quinichette (Sonet, 1976)
 Crazy Legs & Friday Strut with Buddy Tate (Sackville, 1977)
 Kansas City On My Mind (Black and Blue, 1977)
 The Last of the Blue Devils (Atlantic, 1978)
 A Tribute to Fats Waller (Sackville, 1978)
 Kansas City Hustle (Sackville, 1978)
 The Big Apple Bash (Atlantic, 1979)
 The Man from Muskogee with Claude Williams (Sackville, 1980)
 Tuxedo Junction with Don Thompson (Sackville, 1980)
 Last of the Whorehouse Piano Players with Ralph Sutton (Chaz Jazz, 1980)
 Saturday Night Function with the Sackville All-Stars (Sackville, 1981)
 After Hours (Storyville, 1982)
 Best of Friends with Al Casey (JSP, 1982)
 Blowin' in from K.C. with Joe Thomas (Uptown, 1983)
 Just a Lucky So and So (Sackville, 1984)
 Live in France Vol. 2 with Eddie Cleanhead Vinson (Black and Blue, 1984)
 Roll 'em (Black and Blue, 1987)
 Last of the Whorehouse Piano Players with Ralph Sutton (Chiaroscuro, 1989) 
 Paris All-Star Blues (Jazz Heritage, 1991)
 Blue Pianos with Axel Zwingenberger (Vagabond, 1991)
 A Tribute to Charlie Parker (Limelight/Musicmasters, 1991)
 Stride Piano Summit with Dick Hyman, Ralph Sutton (Milestone, 1991)
 Jimmy Witherspoon & Jay McShann (Black Lion, 1992)
 The Missouri Connection with John Hicks (Reservoir, 1993)
 Some Blues (Chiaroscuro, 1993)
 Airmail Special (Sackville, 1994)
 Swingmatism with Don Thompson, Archie Alleyne (Sackville, 1994)
 Piano Playhouse (Night Train, 1996)
 Hootie's Jumpin' Blues with Duke Robillard (Stony Plain, 1997)
 My Baby with the Black Dress On (Chiaroscuro, 1998)
 Still Jumpin' the Blues with Duke Robillard, Maria Muldaur (Stony Plain, 1999)
 What a Wonderful World (Groove Note, 1999)
 Hootie! (Chiaroscuro, 2000)
 Goin' to Kansas City with Duke Robillard (Stony Plain, 2003)
 Hootie Blues (Stony Plain, 2006)

As sideman
With Clarence Gatemouth Brown
 Cold Strange (Black and Blue, 1977)
 More Stuff (Black and Blue, 1985)
 Pressure Cooker (Alligator, 1985)
 Just Got Lucky (Orbis, 1993)

With others
 Walter Brown, Confessin' the Blues (Affinity, 1981)
 Al Casey, Jumpin' with Al (Black and Blue, 1974)
 Slim Gaillard, Anytime, Anyplace, Anywhere! (Hep, 1983)
 Jim Galloway, Thou Swell (Sackville, 1981)
 Jim Galloway, Kansas City Nights (Sackville, 1993)
 Tiny Grimes, Tiny Grimes (Black and Blue, 1970)
 Tiny Grimes, Some Groovy Fours (Black and Blue, 1996)
 Helen Humes, Helen Comes Back (Black and Blue, 1973)
 Helen Humes, On the Sunny Side of the Street (Black Lion, 1975)
 Julia Lee, Tonight's the Night (Charly, 1982)
 Duke Robillard, The Acoustic Blues & Roots of (Stony Plain, 2015)
 Eddie "Cleanhead" Vinson, Kidney Stew is Fine (Delmark, 1969)
 T-Bone Walker, Feelin' the Blues (Black and Blue, 1999)
 Jackie Washington, Keeping Out of Mischief (Borealis 1995)
 Claude Williams, Fiddler's Dream (Black and Blue, 1977)
 Axel Zwingenberger, Swing the Boogie! (Vagabond, 1996)

References

External links
 Interview with Jay McShann for the NAMM (National Association of Music Merchants) Oral History Program October 11, 2005

1916 births
2006 deaths
Big band bandleaders
Swing pianists
Mainstream jazz pianists
Jump blues musicians
People from Muskogee, Oklahoma
Singers from Oklahoma
American blues singers
American blues pianists
American male pianists
American jazz pianists
Vee-Jay Records artists
20th-century American pianists
20th-century American singers
Jazz musicians from Oklahoma
20th-century American male musicians
American male jazz musicians
Sackville Records artists
Black Lion Records artists
Black & Blue Records artists
Chiaroscuro Records artists
Stony Plain Records artists
Atlantic Records artists
Uptown Records (jazz) artists